Slagelse is a town on Zealand, Denmark. The town is the seat of Slagelse Municipality, and is the biggest town of the municipality. It is located 15 km east of Korsør, 16 km north-east of Skælskør, 33 km south-east of Kalundborg and 14 km west of Sorø.

History

Slagelse has been inhabited since at least the Viking Age, where it was a Pagan site. Trelleborg, a ring castle, was built near the current location of Slagelse in 980, which made the location strategically important. A church was built at Slagelse's current location in the 1000s. Around this time, coins were minted in Slagelse.

Antvorskov was built in the 1100s by Valdemar I, who had recently acquired Zealand. He built the monastery in an attempt to gain control and favor with the locals. The monastery was used by the Knights Hospitaller. 

Slagelse was granted the status of a market town in 1288 by Eric V. This gave the town a series of privileges, though eventually put it in competition with the neighboring market towns of Korsør and Skælskør. In the 1780s a road from Copenhagen to Korsør was built, and this road ran through Slagelse.

Sights
Slagelse Park (Danish: Slagelse Lystanlæg) is a park located centrally in Slagelse. It is a green recreational area, with lakes, playgrounds and a maze.

Slagelse Museum is located centrally in Slagelse. The museum focuses mainly on trade and artisanry. It includes a reconstruction of a shop from the 1940-1950s, as well as sections on local history. A part of the museum is dedicated to H. C. Andersen, who went to school in Slagelse.

Antvorskov

The Antvorskov Monastery Ruins are located in southern Slagelse. They are the ruins of Antvorskov Monastery, a monastery built in 1164 by Valdemar I. It was the first Knights Hospitaller monastery in Denmark, and was used as monastery until 1536 when the crown took over ownership and turned into a castle. Frederik II used the castle between 1580 and 1584. After that it was used by fief lords until 1717, when it became a ryttergods - a location for the Danish cavalry. It was sold in 1774 and most of the castle was torn down in 1816.

Transportation

Rail

Slagelse is located on the main line Copenhagen–Fredericia railway from Copenhagen to Funen and Jutland, and the Tølløse Line connects Slagelse with Tølløse on the Northwest Line. Slagelse railway station is the principal railway station of the town, and offers direct InterCity services to Copenhagen, Funen and Jutland, regional train services to Copenhagen and  operated by the national railway company DSB and local train services to  operated by the regional railway company Lokaltog.

Notable residents

Public thought and politics
 Ludvig Stoud Platou (1778–1833), historical and geographical writer
 Georg Koës (1782–1811), philologist
 William Christopher Zeise (1789–1847), chemist
 Jørgen Peter Frederik Wulff (1808–1881), naval officer
 Anna Laursen (1845–1911), schoolteacher and women's rights activist
 Niels Erik Nørlund (1885–1981), mathematician
 Margrethe Nørlund Bohr (1890–1984), editor and transcriber for Danish physicist Niels Bohr
 Hilmar Baunsgaard (1920–1989), politician and leader of the Danish Social Liberal Party from 1968–1975
 Villum Christensen (born 1954), politician and MF
 Kim Christiansen (born 1956), politician and MF
 Stén Knuth (born 1964), politician and MF
 Louise Schack Elholm (born 1977), politician and MF
 Rasmus Horn Langhoff (born 1980), politician and MF

Art
 Johan Jacob Bruun (1715–1789), painter
 Andrea Krætzmer (1811–1889), ballet dancer
 Didrik Frisch (1835–1867), landscape painter
 Ludvig Abelin Schou (1838–1867), painter
 Hans Egede Budtz (1889–1968), actor
 Ella Ungermann (1891–1921), actress
 Vilhelm Lauritzen (1894–1984), architect and founder of the Vilhelm Lauritzen Architects architectural firm
 Hardy Rafn (1930–1997), actor
 Stig Brøgger (born 1941), artist
 Torben Lendager (born 1951), singer
 Kirsten Siggard (born 1954), singer and 3-time participant of the Eurovision Song Contest
 Karsten Kiilerich (born 1955), director, writer and animator
 Elle Klarskov Jørgensen (born 1958), sculptor
 Simone Egeriis (born 1992), pop singer
 Alex Høgh Andersen (born 1994), actor

Sport
 Fred K. Nielsen (1879–1963), college football coach
 Hans Olsen (fencer) (1886–1976), fencer 
 Poul Toft Jensen (1912–2000), football player
 Gunner Olesen (1916–1979), gymnast
 Villy Moll Nielsen (1927), field hockey player
 Poul Moll Nielsen (1930 - 1992), field hockey player
 Torben Alstrup Jensen (1930 - 2007), field hockey player 
 Willy Kristoffersen (born 1933), field hockey player
 Ernst Pedersen (born 1935), former sports shooter
 Vagn Bangsborg (born 1936), former cyclist
 Ole Ritter (born 1941), former cyclist
 Bo Braastrup Andersen (born 1976), football manager and former goalkeeper
 Martin Kristjansen (born 1977), boxer
 Joachim Persson (born 1983), badminton player
 Buster Juul (born 1993), handball player
 Niklas Larsen (born 1997), cyclist

References

 
Municipal seats of Region Zealand
Municipal seats of Denmark
Cities and towns in Region Zealand
Slagelse Municipality